The Electric Lucifer is an album by Bruce Haack combining acid rock and electronic sounds. AllMusic describes it as "a psychedelic, anti-war song cycle about the battle between heaven and hell." Haack used a Moog synthesizer and his own home-built electronics, including an early prototype vocoder. It was originally released on LP in 1970 and has been re-mastered and re-released on CD several times. The 2007 Omni Records CD release included a radio interview from 1970 and an alternate version of "Electric to Me Turn" as a bonus track.  "Song of the Death Machine" and "Word Game" both feature vocals by Chris Kachulis. The lyrics mention concepts such as "powerlove" — a force so strong and good that it will not only save mankind but Lucifer himself.

Track listing
All tracks composed by Bruce Haack

Personnel
Bruce Haack - all instruments, vocals on ""Word Game", "Song of the Death Machine" and "Super Nova", narration on "The Word"
Farad - vocals on "Electric to Me Turn", "Incantation" and "Word Game"
Jon St. John - vocals on "Cherubic Hymn", "Program Me", "Song of the Death Machine" and "Requiem"
Tony Taylor - vocals on Cherubic Hymn", "Program Me", "Angel Child", "Song of the Death Machine" and "Requiem"
Chris Kachulis - vocals
Gary Dersarkissian - child voice on "War"
Arthur Kendy - stereo effects on "Super Nova"
Andrew Kazdin - programming
Technical
Arthur Kendy, Peter Granet, Ray Moore - engineer
Isadore Seltzer - front cover artwork

References

External links
Information at brucehaack.com
Electric Lucifer at Discogs
Electric Lucifer at Bandcamp

1970 albums
Bruce Haack albums
Columbia Records albums